Haystack is a census-designated place (CDP) in McKinley County, New Mexico, United States. It was first listed as a CDP prior to the 2020 census.

County Road 23 (Haystack Road) forms the southern edge of the CDP, and County Road 41 (Red Mountain Road) runs north-south through the CDP.

Haystack was a significant area of uranium mining during the mid-20th century.

Demographics

Education
It is in Gallup-McKinley County Public Schools.

References 

Census-designated places in McKinley County, New Mexico
Census-designated places in New Mexico